Laevicardium crassum, the Norwegian egg cockle, is a species of saltwater clam, a cockle, a marine bivalve mollusc in the family Cardiidae, the cockles.

Fossil record
Fossils of Laevicardium crassum are found in marine strata of the Quaternary (age range: from 0.126 to 0.012 million years ago.).  Fossils are known from various localities in Ireland, Italy, Netherlands and Portugal.

Description
The shell exterior is white or light yellow with occasional dark markings. The shell surface is smooth and shows 40-50 ribs with a crenulated margin.

<div align=center>
Right and left valve of the same specimen:

</div align=center>

Distribution
This species is present in Northeast Atlantic and the Mediterranean, at depths of 9 to 200 m.

Bibliography
 Gmelin, J.F., 1788-1793. In: Linné, C., Systema naturae, Edit. 13 aucta et reformata cura J.F. Gmelin. 10 vols, Lipsiae. 1788-1793 et Lugduni, 1789-1796. -1,6,

References

Cardiidae
Bivalves described in 1791
Taxa named by Johann Friedrich Gmelin